Zahid Cheema (born 4 December 1990) is an Italian cricketer. He was named in Italy's squad for the 2016 ICC World Cricket League Division Four tournament in Los Angeles, playing in one match. In November 2019, he was named in Italy's squad for the Cricket World Cup Challenge League B tournament in Oman. He made his List A debut, for Italy against Kenya, on 3 December 2019.

References

External links
 

1990 births
Living people
Italian cricketers
Place of birth missing (living people)
Pakistani emigrants to Italy